Zhengzhou Commodity Exchange (ZCE), established in 1990, is a futures exchange in Zhengzhou, one of the four futures exchanges in China. The ZCE is under the vertical management of China Securities Regulatory Commission (CSRC).

Products
ZCE specializes in agricultural and chemical product futures, including hard white wheat, strong gluten wheat, sugar, cotton, rapeseed oil and PTA, a petroleum-based chemical product.

History
Zhengzhou Commodity Exchange was the first experimental futures market approved by the State Council, established on October 12, 1990. The ZCE, which started with forward contract trading, launched its first futures contracts on five agricultural products - wheat, corn, soybean, green bean and sesame on May 28, 1993.

1988 - Research Group of China Zhengzhou Grain and Oil Futures Market was set up.

1990 - China Zhengzhou Grain Wholesale Market (CZGWM) was approved to run on an experimental basis by the State Council.

1991 - In March 1991, China 's first forward contract was signed under the organization and supervision of CZGWM.

1992 - Vice Premier Zhu Rongji inspected CZGWM.

1993 - CZCE launched futures contracts including wheat, corn, soybean, green bean (mung bean) and sesame.

1994 - The contracts of peanut kernel, soybean meal, red bean were introduced, and afternoon session was opened.

1996 - Jiang Zemin, General Secretary of the Central Committee of the Chinese Communist Party (CCP), President of the People's Republic of China 
(PRC) and Chairman of the Central Military Commission, inspected CZCE.

2001 - ZCE and ZCGWM were separated into two independent organizations.

2003 - The trading volume of 2003 was 49.82 million contracts, up 17.3 percent from the previous year.

2006 - White sugar futures contracts were launched at ZCE, and ZCE sponsored the 1st China (Shenzhen) Sugar Industry Peak Forum.

2009 - ZCE held opening-bell ceremony of early indica rice futures.

See also
List of futures exchanges
List of stock exchanges
List of stock market indices
Hong Kong Exchanges and Clearing

External links
 Official Website of the ZCE
 ZCE History

Zhengzhou
Financial services companies established in 1990
Commodity exchanges in China